Wojtal is a PKP railway station in Wojtal (Pomeranian Voivodeship), Poland.

Lines crossing the station

References 
Wojtal article at Polish Stations Database, URL accessed at 7 March 2006

Railway stations in Pomeranian Voivodeship
Chojnice County